The 1939–40 season was Stoke City's fifth season in the non-competitive War League. It would have been their 26th season in the Football League First Division but after just three matches the League was cancelled due to World War II.

In 1939 World War II was declared and the Football League was cancelled. In its place were formed War Leagues and cups, based on geographical lines rather than based on previous league placement. However, none of these were considered to be competitive football, and thus their records are not recognised by the Football League and thus not included in official records.

Season review
Stoke started the 1939–40 season with a match against Wolverhampton Wanderers in the Football League Jubilee Fund losing 4–2. The Stoke players wore squad numbers for the first time in this match. After just three First Division matches had been played the Football League was cancelled and although a regional war-league was set up attendances suffered alarmingly. Stoke had looked a useful side with a lot of young, talented players before the hostilities came along and ruined the careers of many and from October 1939 to May 1946 the club missed out on what could have been a successful seven-year period.

With the cancellation of the league action, the re-organised competitions started on 21 October 1939, with 82 of the 88 clubs participating. Stoke drew their first match 4–4 with Everton with Tommy Sale scoring a fine hat-trick. With players being called up for military duty and with travelling very difficult plus the fact that Stanley Matthews was in heavy demand for guest matches team selection was never easy for Bob McGrory. Stoke brought in their own guest players to the Victoria Ground and they proved to be very successful as Stoke won the 1939–40 Western League finishing two points ahead of Liverpool.

Final league table

West Regional Championship

First Division
 Note: The Football League was cancelled after three matches.

Results

Stoke's score comes first

Legend

Football League Jubilee Fund

Football League First Division

West Regional Championship

Football League War Cup

Friendlies

Squad statistics

References

Stoke City F.C. seasons
Stoke City